Ütopya is the Turkish version of the Dutch TV series Utopia, created by John de Mol. The series follows a group of people who attempt to maintain a society in a remote area. The format was bought by Acun Ilıcalı and his television Tv8 began airing Ütopya on October 30, 2014. Tuncay Kes finished the show as the champion.

Cast
This is the cast of the show on July 22, 2015

Past Utopians

References

2014 Turkish television series debuts
Turkish reality television series
Utopias and reality
TV8 (Turkish TV channel) original programming